Right or Wrong is the third studio album by American country music artist George Strait, released on October 6, 1983 by MCA Records.

Right or Wrong topped Billboard's (North America) Top Country albums chart, and peaked at #163 on the Billboard 200 albums chart. The singles "You Look So Good in Love" (which was Strait's first song to have a music video), "Right or Wrong" and "Let's Fall to Pieces Together" all topped the Hot Country Singles chart. There were three cover songs on the album: 1) "Right or Wrong", a traditional song dating back to the 1920s which was previously most associated with the Emmett Miller and Bob Wills versions; 2) the Hank Williams song "I'm Satisfied with You"; and 3) the Merle Haggard song, "Our Paths May Never Cross". The album was recorded and mixed digitally.

Track listing

Personnel

Music
 George Strait – lead vocals
 Hargus "Pig" Robbins – keyboards
 Bobby Wood – keyboards
 Weldon Myrick – steel guitar 
 Johnny Gimble – fiddle, mandolin
 Gregg Galbraith – electric guitar
 Reggie Young – electric guitar
 George "Leo" Jackson – acoustic guitar
 Jimmy Capps – acoustic guitar
 Gregg Galbraith – acoustic guitar
 Bob Moore – upright bass
 Henry Strzelecki – bass guitar
 Leon Rhodes – bass guitar
 Jerry Carrigan – drums
 Gene Chrisman – drums
 Hurshel Wiginton – background vocals
 Donna Sheridan – background vocals
 Judy Rodman – background vocals
 Louis Dean Nunley – background vocals
 Doug Clements – background vocals

Production
 Ray Baker – producer
 Les Ladd – engineer
 Rick McCollister – engineer
 Ron Reynolds – engineer
 Milan Bogdan – digital editing
 Simon Levy – CD art direction
 Camille Engel Advertising – CD design
 Katie Gillon – CD coordination
 Sherri Halford – CD coordination
 Rick Henson – cover photo

Charts

Weekly charts

Year-end charts

Certifications

References

1983 albums
George Strait albums
MCA Records albums
Albums produced by Ray Baker (music producer)